In mathematics, the subspace theorem says that points of small height in projective space lie in a finite number of hyperplanes.

Statement
The subspace theorem states that if L1,...,Ln are linearly independent linear forms in n variables with algebraic coefficients and if ε>0 is any given real number, then
the non-zero integer points x with

lie in a finite number of proper subspaces of Qn.

Applications
The theorem may be used to obtain results on Diophantine equations such as Siegel's theorem on integral points and solution of the S-unit equation.

A corollary on Diophantine approximation
The following corollary to the subspace theorem is often itself referred to as the subspace theorem.
If a1,...,an are algebraic such that 1,a1,...,an are linearly independent over Q and ε>0 is any given real number, then there are only finitely many rational n-tuples (x1/y,...,xn/y) with

The specialization n = 1 gives the Thue–Siegel–Roth theorem. One may also note that the exponent 1+1/n+ε is best possible by Dirichlet's theorem on diophantine approximation.

References

 
 
 
 
 

Diophantine approximation
Theorems in number theory